Jarek Molski is a disabled man known for filing hundreds of lawsuits against small businesses for violations of the Americans with Disabilities Act. Since a 1985 motorcycle accident that left him paralyzed, Molski has filed over 400 lawsuits against California small businesses due to lack of handicap parking, misplaced handrails, and other Disabilities Act violations.

Molski has received heavy criticism over his lawsuits. In 2004, a federal judge accused Molski of extortion, calling him a "hit-and-run plaintiff", and barred Molski from filing further lawsuits. Moski appealed the judge's order to the United States Supreme Court, but was denied after they refused to hear his case.

Lawsuits
All of Molski's lawsuits have been exclusive to small businesses for violating the Americans with Disabilities Act. Of them, only one went to a trial, while the rest have been settled out of court. San Francisco attorney, Tom Frankovich has represented Molski in 232 of his cases. He is estimated to have earned over $10 million from Molski's cases.

References

Living people
United States lawsuits
United States disability case law
Year of birth missing (living people)
American disability rights activists